Pannaria phyllidiata is a species of lichen in the family Pannariaceae. Known from Australia, it was described as new to science in 2011.

References

Lichen species
Lichens described in 2011
Fungi of Australia
Peltigerales
Taxa named by Arve Elvebakk